General Pershing was a  wooden auxiliary vessel, a five masted bald-headed schooner. Built in 1918, Olympia Washington, General Pershing was powered with two 350 hp Sumner surface ignition engines.

Operational history 

General Pershing was originally built for use in the Atlantic trade by Norwegian interests and in 1921 was sold to the P.E. Harris Company of Seattle Washington for transporting salmon from Alaska canneries to the Atlantic and Gulf Coast markets via the Panama Canal.

On July 11, 1921, General Pershing struck the Endymion Rock, Turks Islands and was wrecked. Her crew were rescued.

References

Commercial fishing in Alaska
United States
Merchant ships of the United States
1918 ships
Ships built in Olympia, Washington
Maritime incidents in 1921
Shipwrecks in the Caribbean Sea